Parth Bharat Thakkar (born 9 July 1989) is a music director and singer from Gujarati cinema. He is known for his works in Gujjubhai the Great, Chhello Divas, Daav Thai Gayo Yaar and Love Ni Bhavai.

Parth is also known for his music composition of the song "Mann Melo" from the 2018 Gujarati romantic film Sharato Lagu. The song was highly acclaimed by critics as well as audiences.

Early life 
Parth was born to Bharat Thakkar and Kiran Thakkar on 9 July 1989 at Ahmedabad, Gujarat. He has an elder sister named Nikita. Parth did his schooling from St. Xavier's School, Mirzapur and St. Kabir School, Ahmedabad. He graduated from JG College of Performing Arts, Ahmedabad with Bachelor in Performing Arts.

Parth started learning music at the age of three. At the age of 20, he composed a music album called Majja Ni Life for RJ Dhvanit from Radio Mirchi, Ahmedabad. After that, he worked with Manhar Udhas for a Gujarati album called Anmol. Later he composed songs and background scores for Gujarat government and commercials.

In 2011, he married Jui Dandwala, a clinical psychologist and a music psychology graduate.

Career
Parth debuted as a music director with the film Gujjubhai The Great directed by Ishaan Randeria. The film was released on 18 September 2015, to positive reviews and became a box-office success. Later he worked with film, Chhello Divas – A New Beginning, written and directed by Krishnadev Yagnik. The film premiered on 20 November 2015 with positive reviews from critics and was a huge commercial success. Later he went to do many successful projects like Daav Thai Gayo Yaar, Love Ni Bhavai, GujjuBhai - Most Wanted, Sharato Lagu and so on. He is currently working on the movie Luv Ni Love Storys which will be releasing on 31 January 2020.

Discography

Feature film soundtracks 
Bey Yaar
Gujjubhai The Great
Chhello Divas
Daav Thai Gayo Yaar
Superstar
Chor Bani Thangaat Kare
Rachna No Dabbo
Love Ni Bhavai
Ventilator
GujjuBhai - Most Wanted
Fera Feri Hera Feri
Bho Bho 
Oxygen
Sharato Lagu
Luv Ni Love Storys
Gajab Thai Gayo!
Nayika Devi!
Lakiro!
Hello!

Upcoming
Bachu Bhai
Rang Jo Lagyo
Cuddlers
Hurry Om Hurry
Desert Tears

Awards
International Gujarati Film Festival for Best Music Director – Ventilator 2018.
Gujarati Iconic Film Awards for Best Music Director – Sharato Lagu 2018.
Transmedia Stage & Screen Awards for Best Song – MANNGAMTU - Daav Thai Gayo Yaar 2016.
Transmedia Stage & Screen Awards for Best Music Director – Sharato Lagu 2018.
Gujarati Iconic Film Awards for Best Original Score Of The Year – Luv Ni Love Storys 2019.
Listed by The Indian Achiever’s Club as "The INDIAN ACHIEVER TOP 40 UNDER 40 FOR THE YEAR 2020"
Film Excellence Tourism Award for Best Original Score Of The Year – Luv Ni Love Storys 2020
Gujarat State Award for Best Original Score Of The Year – Chor Bani Thangaat Kare 2020

References

External links
 
 
 
 

1989 births
Living people
Indian male composers
Indian film score composers